Benik Hovhannisyan (born 1 May 1993) is an Armenian professional footballer who plays as a midfielder for Armenian Premier League club Alashkert.

Career

One of his goals was scored in the last round in the 2015–16 Armenian Premier League for FC Ararat Yerevan in a pulsating 1–2 loss to Shirak.

Career statistics

Club

International

Statistics accurate as of match played 28 May 2016

References

Armenian footballers
FC Alashkert players
FC Urartu players
FC Ararat Yerevan players
Armenian Premier League players
Association football midfielders
Living people
1993 births
Armenia youth international footballers
Armenia under-21 international footballers
Armenia international footballers